James Harper Graham (September 18, 1812 – June 23, 1881) was an American politician from New York.

Life
Born in Bovina, New York, Graham attended the public schools and then engaged in agricultural pursuits. He was Town Supervisor of Delhi and Chairman of the Delaware County Board of Supervisors.

Graham was elected as a Republican to the 36th United States Congress, holding office from March 4, 1859, to March 3, 1861.

He was a member of the New York State Assembly (Delaware Co., 2nd D.) in 1871; and of the New York State Senate (23rd D.) in 1872 and 1873.

Afterwards, he engaged in agricultural and mercantile pursuits. He died in Delhi on June 23, 1881, and was buried at the Woodland Cemetery.

References

1812 births
1881 deaths
Republican Party members of the New York State Assembly
Republican Party New York (state) state senators
People from Delaware County, New York
Town supervisors in New York (state)
County legislators in New York (state)
Burials in New York (state)
Republican Party members of the United States House of Representatives from New York (state)
People from Delhi, New York
19th-century American politicians